In enzymology, a cyclohexanone dehydrogenase is an enzyme that catalyzes a chemical reaction

cyclohexanone + acceptor  cyclohex-2-enone + reduced acceptor

Thus, the two substrates of this enzyme are cyclohexanone and acceptor, whereas its two products are cyclohex-2-enone and reduced acceptor.

This enzyme belongs to the family of oxidoreductases, specifically those acting on the CH-CH group of donor with other acceptors.  The systematic name of this enzyme class is cyclohexanone:acceptor 2-oxidoreductase. This enzyme is also called cyclohexanone:(acceptor) 2-oxidoreductase.

References

 

EC 1.3.99
Enzymes of unknown structure